Uthiyan Cheralathan ("Perum Chottu Uthiyan") is earliest known ruler Chera of early historic south India (c. 1st - 4th century CE) from available literary sources. He had his headquarters at a place called Kuzhumur in Kuttanad (southern Kerala). His lifetime was in the late first and early second century CE (he died in 130 after a battle with Karikala Chola). His consort was Veliyan Nallini, the daughter of Veliyan chief Venman.

Uthiyan Cheralatan assumed the title "Vanamvarubavan" which could either mean "One whose Kingdom Reaches up to the Sky" or "the One who is Loved by the Gods". The latter title was previously adopted by the Maurya emperor Asoka.

Uthiyan's elephant corps and cavalry forces are particularly praised in the early Tamil literature. He went into several battles and in the battle of Venni (Vennil) with Karikala Chola, he was wounded on the back while leading the warriors (Akam 55). Being unable to bear the disgrace he committed suicide by slow starvation. It is said that some of his "Companions" also committed suicide with him [unwilling to part him] (Akam 55). Uthiyan Cheralatan was succeeded by his son, Nedum Cheralathan.

Notes

References
 

People of the Chera kingdom
2nd-century Indian monarchs
Chera kings